Valdiviomyia camrasi is a species of Hoverfly in the family Syrphidae.

Distribution
Chile.

References

Eristalinae
Insects described in 1965
Diptera of South America
Endemic fauna of Chile